A Hong Kong returnee is a resident of Hong Kong who emigrated to another country, lived for an extended period of time in his or her adopted home, and then subsequently moved back to Hong Kong.

Population
According to the Hong Kong Transition Project of Hong Kong Baptist University, in 2002, the population of Hong Kong Returnees constituted 3% of the Hong Kong population. This number was arrived at by survey and a participant was categorised as a "Returnee" by self-identification. As such, it excluded those Hong Kongers surveyed who had foreign citizenship, but did not self-identify as "Returnees".

Emigration
Most returnees left Hong Kong during the 1980s and the 1990s leading up to the handover of Hong Kong back to China. According to Matthew Cheung, Secretary for Labour and Welfare, approximately 600,000 people emigrated before and around 1997. The destination of choice was usually a Western country, the most popular being Canada, Australia, and the United States.

There are typically two types of emigrants, those who planned on returning to Hong Kong after they obtained foreign citizenship and those who planned on staying in their adopted homes permanently and fully adapting to life there. The former are sometimes better described as sojourners rather than emigrants. However, often these two types of Hong Kong emigrants act against what they had planned, where some of those who had planned on permanent stays actually returned to Hong Kong, some planning on temporary stays actually made the decision to stay permanently in their adopted homelands.

Remigration
It is estimated that 30% of those Hong Kongers who moved away in the 1980s have returned to Hong Kong. Those that have moved back to Hong Kong have returned for various reasons – for economic reasons, or simply because they enjoy living in Hong Kong more than they do elsewhere. Specifically, many wealthy Hong Kongers who emigrated to Canada found that they could not adjust to the economic culture in Canada. The higher taxes, red tape, and the language contributed to the barrier of entry for businesses in Canada. Comparatively speaking, doing business in Hong Kong was much easier.

"The concept of 'return migration' doesn't quite capture the contingency and fuzziness of Hong Kong emigrant strategies. Returnees could go back to Australia at any stage, especially if they gained Australian citizenship. They could be planning to move back on retirement, or if there are unfavourable 'changes' in Hong Kong. Skeldon (1995: 63) suggests the term 'return movement', since 'return migration' assumes a permanency which may not be justified. Nevertheless, return movements should be distinguished from visits and various types of business and social 'commuting' of a very short-term nature."

Social consequences

Cultural identity
Issues of identity have sometimes arisen for returnees, especially amongst those returnees that left Hong Kong when they were children, because of the change in national identity of Hong Kong the city itself due to Hong Kong returning to Chinese rule, and because of the life experiences gained living in their previously adopted homes outside of Hong Kong.

"Astronauts"
Many of those who returned to Hong Kong were husbands who left their entire families in their adopted homes, while they worked in Hong Kong. These husbands were dubbed Taai Hung Yahn, or "astronauts" because they spend their lives flying back and forth between Hong Kong and the adopted homes of their families.

Taai Hung Yahn is also a play on words. Taking a more literal meaning of the Chinese characters for "astronaut", Taai Hung Yahn can translate loosely to "man without a wife".

See also

 Hongkongers
 Yacht people
 Migration in China
 Overseas Chinese
 China–United Kingdom relations
 Sino-British Joint Declaration
 Third culture kid
 Emigration from Hong Kong

References

External links
 Out and Back: The Movement of Hong Kongers 1984–2004 and the Psychological Consequences for Identity by Nan M. Sussman.
 Hong Kong Residents Rush for Foreign Citizenship at Migration News.
 David Ley on the return of wealthy Chinese migrants from Vancouver to Hong Kong and Taiwan.
 Transnational spaces and everyday lives by David Ley
 Back to Hong Kong: return migration or transnational sojourn? By David Ley and Audrey Kobayashi

Culture of Hong Kong
Hong Kong society
Human migration